Francis Charles Chacksfield (9 May 1914 – 9 June 1995) was an English pianist, organist, composer, arranger, and conductor of popular light orchestral easy listening music, who had great success in Britain and internationally in the 1950s and early 1960s.

Life and career
Chacksfield was born in Battle, East Sussex, and as a child learned to play piano and organ. His organ teacher was J. R. Sheehan-Dare (1857-1934). He had appeared at Hastings Music Festivals by the time he was 14, and then became deputy church organist at Salehurst. After working for a short period in a solicitor's office he decided on a career in music, and by the late 1930s, led a small band at Tonbridge in Kent. At the beginning of World War II, he joined the Royal Army Service Corps,  and, following a radio broadcast as a pianist, was posted to ENSA at Salisbury where he became the arranger for Stars in Battledress, an armed forces entertainment troupe, and shared an office with comedian Charlie Chester.

After the war, he worked with Chester and on BBC Radio as an arranger and conductor. He also worked as musical director for both Henry Hall and Geraldo, and began recording under his own name in 1951 as "Frank Chacksfield's Tunesmiths". In early 1953, he had his first top ten hit, "Little Red Monkey", on the Parlophone label. This was a novelty recording featuring Jack Jordan on the clavioline, and reportedly the first record featuring an electronic instrument to feature on the UK singles chart. He signed a recording contract with Decca Records in 1953, and formed a 40-piece orchestra with a large string section, the "Singing Strings". His first record release for Decca, Charlie Chaplin's theme for his film Limelight, won him a gold disc in the United States, and in the United Kingdom, where it reached No. 2 in the UK Singles Chart, and won him the NME award as 'Record of the Year'. It spent eight weeks at No. 2 (an all-time UK chart record), and in all thirteen weeks in the top five chart positions, without dislodging Frankie Laine's "I Believe". His next 78 single, "Ebb Tide", became the first British instrumental recording to reach No. 1 in some American charts, providing a second gold disc, and he was voted the most promising new orchestra of the year in the US.

He became one of Britain's best known orchestra leaders internationally, and is estimated to have sold more than 20 million albums worldwide. His material was "mood music", similar to that of Mantovani, including ballads, waltzes, and film themes. In 1954, he began presenting a series on BBC TV, which continued occasionally until the early 1960s. Chacksfield was responsible for the musical arrangement of the first UK entry into the Eurovision Song Contest 1957; "All" by Patricia Bredin. He continued to write music, release singles and albums through the 1950s and 1960s, and appeared regularly on BBC radio.

He continued to record occasionally until the 1990s, from the 1970s primarily on the Phase 4 label. He also developed business interests in publishing and recorded for Starborne Productions, a company supplying "canned music" for use by easy listening radio stations and others. Many of these recordings were made commercially available in 2007. Many of his recordings were used during Testcard and Ceefax intervals on BBC1 and BBC2 during the 80s and 90s. His last album was Thanks for the Memories (Academy Award Winners 1934–55), released in 1991. Chacksfield died in Kent in 1995, after having suffered for several years from Parkinson's disease.

The main theme from his Latin-American style track "Cuban Boy" is used as the theme music for the BBC Scotland sitcom Still Game.

His song "Après Ski" was featured in the 2006 video game Saints Row, for the Xbox 360.

From the album All Time Top T.V. Themes (Decca PFS 4087, 1966; also as The Great TV Themes on London SP 44077), several tracks were used by Dutch offshore pirate radio station Radio Veronica in the 1960s. "Rawhide" and "Dragnet" were used in the news jingles; "The Alfred Hitchcock Theme" was also used.

Discography (selected)

Albums
 Presenting Frank Chacksfield and his Orchestra, Michael LL 1041
 Ebb Tide, London LL 1408
 Velvet, London LL 1443
 Love Letters in the Sand, London LL 3027 
 Hollywood Almanac, London LL 3102/3
 On the Beach, London LL 3158 
 Evening in Paris, Decca LK 4081
 The Music of Noel Coward, Decca LK 4090
 Evening in Rome, Decca LK 4095
 The Music of George Gershwin, Decca LK 4113
 If I Had a Talking Picture of You, Decca LK 4135
 Close Your Eyes, Decca LK 4138
 Broadway Melody, Decca LK 4151
 Mediterranean Moonlight, Decca LK 4168
 South Sea Island Magic, Decca LK 4174
 In the Mystic East, Decca LK 4231
 Academy Award Songs Vol. 1 (1934–1945), Decca LK 4302
 Academy Award Songs Vol. 2 (1946–1957), Decca LK 4311
 Glamorous Holiday, Decca SKL 4016
 Immortal Serenades, Decca SKL 4018
 Evening in London, Decca SKL 4057
 Music for Christmas, Decca SKL 4069
 The Million Sellers, Decca SKL 4072
 Opera's Golden Moments, London Phase 4 21092
 The New Ebb Tide, London Phase 4 44053
 Globe-Trotting, London Phase 4 SP 44059
 The New Limelight, London Phase 4 SP 44066
 Hawaii, London Phase 4 SP 44087
 Foreign Film Festival, London Phase 4 SP 44112
 New York, London Phase 4 SP 44141
 Beatles Songbook, London Phase 4 44142
 Simon & Garfunkel & Jimmy Webb, London Phase 4 44151
 Plays Bacharach, London Phase 4 44158
 Plays Ebb Tide and Other Million Sellers, London Phase 4 44168
 Chacksfield Plays Rodgers & Hart, London Phase 4 SP 44223
 The Glory That Was Gershwin, London Phase 4 44254
 Plays Hoagy Carmichael, London Phase 4 44275
 TV's Golden Hits, Compleat Records 671020-1

A number of the Decca/London Phase 4 titles have been reissued on CD by Dutton Vocalion.

Singles

References

External links
The Frank Chacksfield Band in the 1930s
The Decca Years 1953–75
Frank Chacksfield Complete Discography

1914 births
1995 deaths
20th-century English musicians
Neurological disease deaths in England
Deaths from Parkinson's disease
Easy listening musicians
English bandleaders
English conductors (music)
British male conductors (music)
English music arrangers
Decca Records artists
London Records artists
People from Battle, East Sussex
Royal Army Service Corps soldiers
20th-century British male musicians
British Army personnel of World War II